The Itapeva State Park is a state park in the state of Rio Grande do Sul, Brazil.

Location

The Itapeva State Park is in the municipality of Torres, Rio Grande do Sul.
It is in the northeast of the state on the Atlantic coast to the north of the Itapeva Lagoon.
Flora include large fig trees, palniteiros, and a wide variety of orchids and bromeliads.
The park has carnivorous plants of the Drosera and Utricularia species, butia (Butia catarinensis) and buriti (Trithrinax brasiliensis).

Fauna include several species of amphibians, including the rare sapinho-de-barriga vermelha (Melanophryniscus dorsalis), which is threatened with extinction in Brazil.
It is also home to the skull tree iguana (Liolaemus occipitalis).
Bird species include the threatened white-breasted tapaculo (Eleoscytalopus indigoticus), the white-bearded manakin (Manacus manacus) and the laughing falcon (Herpetotheres cachinnans).
Mammals include robust capuchin monkeys, southern tamandua (Tamandua tetradactyla) and several species of opossum.

History

There are traces of prehistoric people and of later European colonizers.

The Itapeva State Park was created by state law in 2002 to protect rare and threatened ecosystems and species of fauna and flora, and to promote scientific research, environmental education and ecotourism.
A version of the management plan was issued in October 2006.
A revised version was issued in October 2010.
The park is in Rio Grande do Sul's part of the Atlantic Forest Biosphere Reserve.

Notes

Sources

State parks of Brazil
Protected areas established in 2002
2002 establishments in Brazil
Protected areas of Rio Grande do Sul